Banshan was a phase of the Chinese Neolithic Majiayao culture, c. 2600 to 2300 BC. The Banshan site is in Guanghe County, Gansu.

In 1923 and 1924, Swedish scholar J. G. Anderson discovered the sites of Banshan, Majiayao, Machang, Qijia and Xindian at Lajia on the north bank of the Yellow River.

Gallery

References

Neolithic cultures of China
26th-century BC establishments
History of Gansu
Linxia Hui Autonomous Prefecture